Upper Sorbian, occasionally referred to as "Wendish", is a minority language spoken by Sorbs in Germany in the historical province of Upper Lusatia, which is today part of Saxony. It is grouped in the West Slavic language branch, together with Lower Sorbian, Czech, Polish, Slovak and Kashubian.

History
The history of the Upper Sorbian language in Germany began with the Slavic migrations during the 6th century AD. Beginning in the 12th century, there was a massive influx of rural Germanic settlers from Flanders, Saxony, Thuringia and Franconia. This so-called "Ostsiedlung" (eastern settlement or expansion) led to a slow but steady decline in use of the Sorbian language. In addition, in the Saxony region, the Sorbian language was legally subordinated to the German language. Language prohibitions were later added: In 1293, the Sorbian language was forbidden in Berne castle before the courts; in 1327 it was forbidden in Zwickau and Leipzig, and from 1424 on it was forbidden in Meissen. Further, there was the condition in many guilds of the cities of the area to accept only members of German-language origin.

However, the central areas of the Milzener and Lusitzer, in the area of today's Lusatia, were relatively unaffected by the new German language settlements and legal restrictions. The language therefore flourished there. By the 17th century, the number of Sorbian speakers in that area grew to over 300,000. The oldest evidence of written Upper Sorbian is the Burger Eydt Wendisch monument, which was discovered in the city of Bautzen and dates to the year 1532.

Upper Sorbian in Germany

There are an estimated 20,000 to 25,000 speakers of Upper Sorbian. Almost all of these live in the state of Saxony, chiefly in the district of Bautzen (Budyšin). The stronghold of the language is the village of Crostwitz (Chrósćicy) and the surrounding municipalities, especially to the west of it. In this core area, Upper Sorbian remains the predominant vernacular.

Phonology

Vowels
The vowel inventory of Upper Sorbian is exactly the same as that of Lower Sorbian. It is also very similar to the vowel inventory of Slovene.

 is mid-centralized to  after hard consonants.
The  and  distinctions are weakened or lost in unstressed syllables.

Consonants

 are very rare.
 is a somewhat velarized bilabial approximant , whereas  (the soft counterpart of ) is a strongly palatalized bilabial approximant .
 are uvular . The alveolar realization  is archaic.
In most dialects,  are palato-alveolar. This is unlike Lower Sorbian, where these consonants are laminal retroflex (flat postalveolar)  (Lower Sorbian  does not have a voiced counterpart). Laminal retroflex realizations of  also occur in Upper Sorbian dialects spoken in some villages north of Hoyerswerda.

Samples
The Lord's Prayer in Upper Sorbian:

Article 1 of the Universal Declaration of Human Rights in Upper Sorbian:

(All human beings are born free and equal in dignity and rights. They are endowed with reason and conscience and should act towards one another in a spirit of brotherhood.)

See also
Lower Sorbian language

References

Bibliography

Ross, Malcom. 2020. Syntax and contact-induced language change. In A. Grant (ed.) The Oxford Handbook of Language Contact. Oxford: Oxford University Press, 123–154. [Upper Sorbian and German contact, with resulting changes in Sorbian]

External links

Online course for Upper and Lower Sorbian (English, Sorbian, German)
Course in Upper Sorbian
Kurs serbskeje rěče,  introductory texts of the lessons included in the Sorbian language textbook  Curs practic de limba sorabă

Dictionaries
 Upper Sorbian dictionary with common phrases
 Upper Sorbian phraseology dictionary
 SorbWord
 Sorbian 'language practice' page at Leipzig University
 Sorbian information page at Leipzig University
 Wortschatz.de

Czech-Sorbian and Sorbian-Czech
at slovnik.vancl.eu

German-Sorbian
at sibz.whyi.org
at Boehmak.de

Sorbian-German
at Boehmak.de
at sibz.whyi.org

 
Sorbian languages
Sorbian, Upper
Sorbian, Upper
Endangered Slavic languages
Culture of Saxony
Upper Lusatia
Slavic languages written in Latin script